Ervin Pruitt (born May 11, 1940) is a retired NASCAR Grand National Series driver who competed in 1968 and 1969 exclusively.

Career

As a driver
While starting an average of 23rd place, Pruitt has generally improved his performance in the races by finishing an average of 18th place. Pruitt has raced primarily on short tracks; only racing on intermediate tracks and restrictor plate tracks only once apiece.

His primary stock car vehicle is the #57 Dodge machine owned by himself and without a permanent sponsor. During his career, Pruitt brought home $2,780 in total career winnings ($ when adjusted for inflation).

As an owner
As a NASCAR team owner, Pruitt has employed legendary NASCAR superstars like Neil Castles, Charlie Glotzbach, James Hylton, Roy Tyner, and Frank Warren. His record while managing a NASCAR team includes two finishes in the "top five" and five finishes in the "top ten." Stock car racing vehicles under Pruitt's command received an average start of 24th place leading up to an average finish of 21st place. These vehicles also raced 9778 laps of top-level stock car racing; while leading only 16 of them.

References

1940 births
Living people
NASCAR drivers
NASCAR team owners
Sportspeople from Spartanburg, South Carolina
Racing drivers from South Carolina